José María Álvarez de Sotomayor (28 September 1880–20 May 1947) was a Spanish playwright and poet from the Province of Almería.

Sources
 Manuel Cáceres Sánchez, 1991: El Almeriense Álvarez de Sotomayor (1880-1947) y la Literatura Rural en España. Almería: Instituto de Estudios Almerienses

1880 births
1947 deaths
Spanish male dramatists and playwrights
Spanish male poets
20th-century Spanish poets
20th-century Spanish dramatists and playwrights
20th-century Spanish male writers